Never Forget Me (lit. "Really Really Don't Forget") is a 1976 South Korean film directed by Mun Yeo-song. It is the 1st movie in the "Really Really" series and was followed later that same year by the 2nd movie I Am Really Sorry, also starring Im Ye-jin and Lee Deok-hwa.

Synopsis
Two high school students have romantic feelings for each other at a time when such relationships are not allowed at their age. Traveling together by train to school every day, they promise to spend their future together. However, they are separated when the boy's family has to move to Seoul, and vow to be reunited as adults. 3 years later, the boy has become an adult and finally has the independence to pursue his heart. He returns to visit the girl but discovers that she has died from pneumonia. He rides the train they took together and reminisces their past.

Cast
 Im Ye-jin as Jung-ah
 Lee Deok-hwa as Young-soo
 Shin Goo as Young-soo's older brother
 Mun Oh-jang: Jung-ah's father
 Kim Yun-gyeong: Miss Muntae
 Yun Hee
 Lee Chang-won
 Kim Bok-sun: Yeong Suk
 Kim Ung
 Han Tae-il

Bibliography

English

Korean

Notes

1976 films
1970s Korean-language films
South Korean romantic drama films
1970s teen romance films
1976 romantic drama films